Joan Carretero i Grau (born 1955 in Tremp, Pallars Jussà) is a Spanish physician and politician. After having been mayor of Puigcerdà, he became a counsellor in the Catalan Government.

Education and Professional background
Joan Carretero received his degree in Medicine and Surgery in 1978 from the UB. He also has a diploma in Health from the Escola Nacional de Salut in Lleida and a master's degree in Public Health from the University of Barcelona. He has worked as doctor in Barbens (Pla d'Urgell), and currently works in Puigcerdà.

Civic background
He has been a member of the Association of Parents of Students of Vedruna School in Puigcerdà  and president of Club de Futbol Puigcerdà (Puigcerdà Football Club). Joan Carretero is associated with FC Barcelona.

Political background
Joan Carretero joined the ERC in 1990. He was expelled from the ERC on 27 April 2009 because of his vocal criticism regarding the direction of the party. On 3 October 2009 he created a new Catalan independentist political party, Reagrupament, but it couldn't get representation in the Catalan parliament.

Institutional background
He became mayor of Puigcerdà in 1995, when he ran the first time, leading ERC's lists. He resigned in December 2003 when he became a minister in the Catalan Government, but he was displaced in April 2006.

References

1955 births
Living people
People from Pallars Jussà
Republican Left of Catalonia politicians
Ministers of Governance and Public Administration of Catalonia
Mayors of places in Catalonia
Leaders of political parties in Spain